Habis Almajali (‎ 1914 – April 22, 2001) was a Jordanian soldier. Almajali served as Chairman of the Joint Chiefs of Staff of the Jordanian Armed Forces from 1958 to 1975, as Minister of Defense from 1967 to 1968, and as a member of the Jordanian Senate for 30 years from 1967 to 1997.

Born in Ma'an, Almajali joined Jordan's Arab Legion in 1932, reportedly gaining a reputation of bravery and canniness. He commanded Jordan's forces against Israel during the 1948 Arab–Israeli War, the Six Day War in 1967 and the Yom Kippur War in 1973; and against the Palestine Liberation Organization and Syria during Black September in 1970. During the last 20 years of his life, he resigned from the army and served as Senator in the Jordanian Parliament's upper chamber.

Almajali is considered to be Jordan's greatest military commander; he was the only Arab commander to inflict military victories against Israelis, Palestinians and Syrians alike. King Hussein's biographer, James Lunt, dubbed Majali the grand seigneur of Karak, and the beau sabreur of the army. Almajali is one of few Jordanians, along with the Kings of Jordan, to hold the Field Marshal rank–the highest rank in the Jordanian army.

Life and career

 
Majali joined Jordan's Arab Legion in 1932, soon impressing Glubb Pasha. Although he acquired modern skills, Majali maintained his Bedouin élan. King Hussein's biographer, James Lunt, dubbed Majali the grand seigneur of Karak and beau sabreur of the army.

Habis Pasha was the only Arab commander to win military victories against Israelis, Palestinians and Syrians alike. His "baptism of fire", according to The Guardian obituary, came during the 1948 Arab–Israeli War, when he successfully defended the town of Latrun near Jerusalem against Israeli forces. He managed to secure the West Bank under Glubb Pasha.

Majali claimed that he had caught Ariel Sharon in the battle, who was then a young Lieutenant. Sharon, who would later become Israeli prime minister, denied the claim. However, Habis boasted: "Sharon is like a grizzly bear, I captured him for 9 days, I healed his wounds and released him due to his insignificance." Few fellow high-ranking Jordanian officers testified in favour of his account.

It was Almajali who was commander of the Royal Guard when King Abdullah I was assassinated on 20 July 1951 as he was entering the Al Aqsa mosque. Abdullah insisted on speaking to the crowds on his way to the mosque, but Almajali thought it was too dangerous and ordered soldiers to surround the King–angering him. The King moved ahead of his guards, and was shot dead by a Palestinian. 

King Hussein found Almajali valuable after he was responsible for tracking down his Nasserite enemies during the upheavals of the 1950s. Almajali was tasked in 1960 with restoring order after Syrian agents had murdered his cousin Prime Minister Hazza' Majali.

Jordan lost the West Bank to Israel during the 1967 Six Day War. Almajali was forced during the war to relinquish Jordan's army command to Egypt. He then resigned, but served as defense minister until 1968.

Almajali was appointed as Chief of Staff of the army in 1970, to supervise the expulsion of Palestinian fedayeen (guerrillas) from Jordan during what became known as Black September.

On the Yom Kippor War in 1973, Trevor N. Dupuy, an American historian, later wrote that Israelis were impressed by "Jordanian tactical performance, evidencing higher professional standards than the Syrians or the Iraqis".

During the last 20 years of his life, he resigned from the army and served as Senator in the Jordanian Parliament's upper chamber.

Honour

Foreign honour
  : Honorary Commander of the Order of the Defender of the Realm (1965)

References

1914 births
2001 deaths
Jordanian generals
Jordanian people of the 1948 Arab–Israeli War
Members of the Senate of Jordan
Defence ministers of Jordan